Bionic Woman may refer to:

 The Bionic Woman, a television series that aired from 1976 to 1978 on ABC and NBC
 Jaime Sommers (The Bionic Woman), the main character
 Bionic Woman (2007 TV series), a 2007 remake of the series on NBC
 Jaime Sommers (Bionic Woman), the main character

See also 

simple:Bionic Woman